Soarelui is a district in southeastern Timișoara. It was built around 1985, being among the last working-class neighborhoods built by the communist regime in Timișoara. Before that year, there were no buildings on these lands, only agricultural plots or pastures. Most of the inhabitants were employed in the factories on the Buziașului industrial platform. Soarelui is the district with one of the highest standard of living in Timișoara.

References 

Districts of Timișoara